Adscita bolivari is a moth of the family Zygaenidae. It is endemic to Spain (where it is absent from the north-east and the Pyrenees).

The length of the forewings is 9–10 mm for males and females. Adults are on wing from June to July.

The larvae probably feed on Helianthemum species.

References

C. M. Naumann, W. G. Tremewan: The Western Palaearctic Zygaenidae. Apollo Books, Stenstrup 1999,

External links

The Barcode of Life Data Systems (BOLD)

Procridinae
Moths described in 1937
Moths of Europe